Fearless is the debut album of American singer-songwriter Keri Noble. It was released under Manhattan Records on March 9, 2004.

Critical reception

Alex Henderson of AllMusic concludes his review with, "Fearless is not an album that goes out of its way to push the smile button; at times, Noble's observations can be dark and melancholy. But if Fearless is less than optimistic on the whole, it is also impressively honest and sincere – emotionally, Noble really lays it on the line, and she shows a great deal of promise on this superb debut."

Steve Morse of The Boston Globe has this to say about Fearless. "Rarely will you hear an artist go from tender apology (as in "A Dream About You," in which Noble takes the blame for fumbling a relationship) to no-nonsense anger (as in "I Won't," which, she said, some people have called her "Alanis Morissette song"). It added up to a profound emotional ride – and here's some further news: Noble's album is even better, because it has a band behind her and some string arrangements tastefully done by Mardin. Right now, Noble is being marketed as a "hot adult-contemporary" artist, whatever that means, but if you like piano ballads from the heart and don't care about labels, then she's worth discovering."

Track listing

Musicians
Keri Noble: Piano, Main Vocal
Jeff Arundel: Six- and Twelve-String Electric Guitars, Gut String Guitar, Backing Vocals, Loops (tracks 2, 4, 8 and 11)
Rob Arthur: Keyboards, Accordion, Backing Vocals, Bass Guitar (track 3), Loops (tracks 2, 4 and 8), Drum Programming (track 5)
Jeff Bailey: Bass Guitar
Kathleen Johnson: Vocal Backing
Rich Mercurio: Drums, Percussion, Loops (track 11)

Additional Musicians
John Conte: Bass Guitar (track 9 and 10)
Ann Klein: Lap Steel Guitar (track 3 and 5), Mandolin (track 10)
John Herchert: Electric Guitar (track 8)
Jeff Victor: Organ (track 1)
Kathleen Johnson: Backing Vocals (track 6)
Jonathan Dinklage: Violin (track 3)
Dirk Freymuth: Electric Guitar (track 11)
String section (tracks 2, 6 and 12)
Jonathan Dinklage: Violin
Antoine Silverman: Violin
Chris Cardona: Viola
Anja Wood: Cello
Wolfgang: Cello

The song "If No One Will Listen" was re-recorded for Kelly Clarkson's 2009 album All I Ever Wanted, which Clarkson received a production credit for.  It is the last track on both Noble's and Clarkson's respective albums.

Track information and credits verified from the album's liner notes. Some information was adapted from Discogs and AllMusic.

References

External links
Keri Noble Official Website

2005 debut albums
Manhattan Records albums